Sparta First Presbyterian Church is a historic Presbyterian church located at Groveland Station in Livingston County, New York. The building is a simple but sophisticated combination of Arts and Crafts principals and freely styled Tudor Gothic detailing executed with modern building materials.  It was constructed in 1915-1916 and is composed of a large principal gable block with a gabled wing.  It features a crenellated tower rising a full story above the ridgeline of the roofs.

It was listed on the National Register of Historic Places in 2007.

References

Churches on the National Register of Historic Places in New York (state)
Presbyterian churches in New York (state)
Arts and Crafts movement
Gothic Revival church buildings in New York (state)
Churches completed in 1916
20th-century Presbyterian church buildings in the United States
Churches in Livingston County, New York
National Register of Historic Places in Livingston County, New York